The 2003–04 WHL season was the 38th season for the Western Hockey League. Twenty teams completed a 72-game season.  The Medicine Hat Tigers won the President's Cup, while the host Kelowna Rockets won the Memorial Cup.

League notes
 The Everett Silvertips joined the WHL as its 20th franchise, playing in the U.S. Division of the western Conference.
 The playoff crossover if the 5th-place team in the B.C. Division finished ahead of the 4th-place team in the U.S. division was discontinued.  The top four teams in each division qualified for the playoffs.
The 2003–04 season became a historic one for the WHL. The Everett Silvertips, the league's newest franchise, broke 10 junior hockey expansion team records, including winning both a division title and conference title in the team's first season. The Silvertips also became the first expansion team in WHL history to win a playoff series against the league's top team in the regular season, defeating the regular-season champions and reigning WHL champions Kelowna Rockets in seven games after falling behind 3–1 in the Western Conference Finals before winning three straight games in overtime, becoming the first junior hockey expansion team to win a conference title.

Regular season

Final standings

Eastern Conference

Western Conference

Scoring leaders
Note: GP = Games played; G = Goals; A = Assists; Pts = Points; PIM = Penalties in minutes

Goaltending leaders
Note: GP = Games played; Min = Minutes played; W = Wins; L = Losses; T = Ties ; GA = Goals against; SO = Total shutouts; SV% = Save percentage; GAA = Goals against average

2004 WHL Playoffs

Conference quarterfinals

Eastern Conference

Western Conference

Conference semifinals

Conference finals

WHL Championship

RE/Max Canada-Russia Challenge

On November 26, Team WHL defeated the Russian Selects 4–1 in Calgary, Alberta before a crowd of 7,844.

On November 27, Team WHL defeated the Russian Selects 7–1 in Brandon, Manitoba before a crowd of 4,908.

WHL awards

All-Star Teams

source: Western Hockey League press release

2004 Bantam Draft
The 2004 WHL Bantam Draft was held at the WHL's head office in Calgary on April 29, 2004.

List of first round picks in the bantam draft.

See also
2004 Memorial Cup
2004 NHL Entry Draft
2003 in sports
2004 in sports

References
whl.ca
 2005–06 WHL Guide

Western Hockey League seasons
WHL
WHL